Yasemin Taşkın is a Turkish journalist and writer who has lost her job because of the Turkish government's censorship policies.

References

Living people
Journalists from Istanbul
Year of birth missing (living people)